This is a list of the members of the Dewan Rakyat (House of Representatives) of the 13th Parliament of Malaysia. The opposition coalition Pakatan Rakyat that contested the general elections in 2013 was dissolved after series of disagreements between two main parties, Democratic Action Party (DAP) and Pan-Malaysian Islamic Party (PAS). A new opposition coalition Pakatan Harapan was formed by the DAP, People's Justice Party (PKR) and newly formed party  National Trust Party (AMANAH), consisting of ex-PAS members. Several ex-UMNO members have also formed their own party Malaysian United Indigenous Party (BERSATU) and have signed an electoral pact with Pakatan Harapan to contest the future general election and ensure straight fights against Barisan Nasional. On 20 March 2017 BERSATU officially became a member of Pakatan Harapan.

Composition

Seating arrangement

Old meeting hall in Dewan Rakyat
This is the seating arrangement based on the old meeting hall in previous interior, as of its last meeting on 24 November 2016 before meeting hall was moved to new meeting hall on the following year.

New meeting hall in Dewan Rakyat
This is the seating arrangement based on the new meeting hall in current interior as of its last meeting on 5 April 2018. In addition, there were two seats that is labelled as VACANT, namely Jelebu and Paya Besar. Both of this seats vacancy is due to the death of the incumbent Member of Parliament (MP) for both of this constituency, which happened on 6 December 2017 (Jelebu) and 12 February 2018 (Paya Besar) respectively.

Elected members by state 


Unless noted otherwise, the MPs served the entire term of the parliament (from 24 June 2013 to 7 April 2018).

Perlis

Kedah

Kelantan

Terengganu

Penang

Perak

Pahang

Selangor

Federal Territory of Kuala Lumpur

Federal Territory of Putrajaya

Negeri Sembilan

Malacca

Johor

Federal Territory of Labuan

Sabah

Sarawak

Notes

References 

13th Parliament of Malaysia
Lists of members of the Dewan Rakyat